In aviation, a control area (CTA) is the volume of controlled airspace that exists in the vicinity of an airport. It has a specified lower level and a specified upper level. It usually is situated on top of a control zone and provides protection to aircraft climbing out from the airport by joining the low-level control zone to the nearest airways. In the UK they are generally class A, D or E.

Control areas are particularly useful where there are busy airports located close together. In this case a single CTA will sit over all of the individual airports' CTRs. In larger-scale cases, this is known as a terminal manoeuvring area (TMA).

See also
Airway (aviation)
Flight information region

Air traffic control